Bowling took place for the men's and women's individual, doubles, trios, and team events at the 2002 Asian Games in Busan, South Korea from October 3 to October 9. All events were held at the Homeplus Asiad Bowling Alley.

Schedule

Medalists

Men

Women

Medal table

Participating nations
A total of 149 athletes from 18 nations competed in bowling at the 2002 Asian Games:

References
 2002 Asian Games website
2002 Asian Games Official Report, Pages 301–327

External links
 www.abf-online.org

 
2002 Asian Games events
2002
Asian Games
2002 Asian Games